Wolfs is a surname. Notable people with the surname include:

Mike Wolfs (born 1970), Canadian sailor
Noémie Wolfs (born 1988), Belgian singer
Sofie Wolfs (born 1981), Belgian swimmer

See also 
 Wolf (disambiguation)